Revenge of the 'Gator, known in Europe as Pinball: Revenge of the 'Gator, is an alligator-themed pinball video game developed and published by HAL Laboratory. It was released for the original Game Boy in 1989/1990. The objective of the game is to score as many points as possible without having the player's pinball eaten by the gator.

Gameplay
The player launches the ball from the Shooter Lane and with the flippers that he uses to hit the ball around screen hitting targets and rolling through lanes to score points. There are four modes of play in Revenge of the 'Gator; Gator 1Player, Gator 2Player, Match Play A, Match Play B.

Gator 1Player/Gator 2Player
These two modes are the same game; the difference is that in Gator 2Player, Player 1 and Player 2 alternate turns by sharing one Game Boy. The objective of these modes is to gain a high score and have the player's name added to the "Top 5" score screen when his game is over. There are eight playing areas total; four Primary Screens, three Bonus Stages and one Gator Screen.

Screen A is the top of the Pinball game. The player's objective is to hit the fish on the upper left and right rollover where they pop out and become Gator Bait for the gator in the cage. Once the gator is fattened up it will break out of the cage where the player will have a chance to hit it for an extra ball. It is in this screen where if the player gets his ball into the upper left slot he will warp to Bonus Stage 3.

Screen B is the area below Screen A. Here there are a bunch of blocks in front of a door and a slot. Knocking out all the block on the left side will take the player to Bonus Stage 2, while the right side will open the door to Screen A. If the player rolls over three gators to full size, he will gain side savers and the saver post.

Screen C is the opening area from where the player launches his pinball. If he manages to light all four hearts, the player activates the side savers and the side posts. If the player hits the left three targets, he opens the door to Screen B. Rolling the ball around the Loop Lane to the right activates the Slot Machine.

Screen D is the bottom of the Pinball game. Here the player has seven gators that give him bonuses. Gators 1, 2 and 3 open and close their mouths; if the player hits the ball the into their mouths, they will send to three locations in the game. Gators 4, 5, 6 and 7 offer the player two bonuses in the screen. It is also in this screen where the player launches his ball to Screen C. Should the player miss the balls with his flipper, the ball will go out of the game and into the Gator Screen.

Gator Screen is where the player's ball falls down to end his turn. It is an animation of the player's ball falling into the mouth of a gator where his belly is flattened and the player is taken to the score screen before starting his next turn.

In Bonus Stage 1, the player must knock out all the blocks to make the gator fall. If you hit the gator you get 10,000 points.

In Bonus Stage 2, the player must break five eggs to hatch baby gators then hit the baby gators for 30,000 points.

In Bonus Stage 3, the player must hit each small gator head that pops out of the hole in order to make the big gator head pop out for 50,000 points.

Match Play A/Match Play B
This is the two player mode of Revenge of the 'Gator. Match Play A is for beginners and Match Play B is for experts. Both players can see each other's side of the screen. Both players knock the ball back and forth until one of them gets the past the flippers. Hitting your opponents targets will reduce the opponent's points. The first player to reduce his opponents points to zero and hits the 'Gator and Crossbones' wins the game.

There are three gators for each player, rolling over them will make them appear, grow large, then disappear. If the player can get all three gators to be large at the same time he will get side savers and the saver post.

Items are scattered throughout the match which affects play. Which player is affected is determined by the direction of the ball.

Reception

Revenge of the 'Gator received generally positive reception from video game critics.

Reviewing the 3DS version, Damien McFerran of Nintendo Life gave the game 7 out of 10 , and summarized: "Revenge of the 'Gator may lack the refinements showcased by modern pinball games, but that doesn't mean it should be ignored if you're a fan of the genre. The simplistic nature of the tables means you can give high-score chasing your full, undivided attention without being waylaid by distractions, and the ball physics are respectable enough to ensure you don't lose any games through anything but your own fault. HAL's effort may have been improved upon in recent years, but it's still an appealing and addictive pinball outing."

Legacy
Revenge of the Gator was re-released (with Match Play disabled) for the Nintendo 3DS Virtual Console on January 9, 2013, in Japan, September 5, 2013, in Europe and on October 17, 2013, in North America.

A ROM hack, Revenge of the 'Gator Gold, was released in 2023. It adds colors to the game, removes slowdown, allows high scores to be saved between sessions, and fixes various bugs.

Notes

References

External links

GameFAQs

1989 video games
Fictional crocodilians
Game Boy games
HAL Laboratory games
Pinball video games
Video games about reptiles
Video games developed in Japan
Virtual Console games
Multiplayer and single-player video games
Virtual Console games for Nintendo 3DS